Montefalcone nel Sannio is a comune (municipality) in the Province of Campobasso in the Italian region Molise, located about  north of Campobasso.

Montefalcone nel Sannio borders the following municipalities: Castelmauro, Celenza sul Trigno, Montemitro, Roccavivara, San Felice del Molise.

References

Cities and towns in Molise
Hilltowns in Molise